Paremhat 8 - Coptic Calendar - Paremhat 10

The ninth day of the Coptic month of Paremhat, the seventh month of the Coptic year. In common years, this day corresponds to March 5, of the Julian Calendar, and March 18, of the Gregorian Calendar. This day falls in the Coptic Season of Shemu, the season of the Harvest.

Commemorations

Martyrs 

 The martyrdom of Saints Abrianus, Martha his wife, Eusebius, Armanius, and Forty Martyrs

Saints 

 The departure of Saint Konan the Confessor

References 

Days of the Coptic calendar